The Walter Lawrence Trophy is an annual award made to the player who has scored the fastest century in English domestic county cricket that season, in terms of balls received (not counting wides). Hundreds are considered by a panel of experts which, as of 2020, comprise Michael Atherton, David Gower, Simon Hughes and John Barclay. Those which are adjudged to have been made against declaration bowling are not eligible for the award, although this restriction was not always observed in former years.  , the recipient of the Walter Lawrence Trophy is also presented with a cheque for £2,500.

The trophy was instituted in 1934 by Sir Walter Lawrence, a builder and cricket enthusiast from Hertfordshire, the first recipient being Frank Woolley. At this stage in its history, the criterion was the time taken to score a hundred rather than the number of balls faced. The award was made every season up to and including 1939 when Lawrence died. When first class cricket resumed in 1945 after the Second World War, Lawrence's son Guy left the presentation of the Trophy in abeyance. It was finally re-instated by Guy's son-in-law, Brian Thornton for the 1966 season. The recipient was then the player who had scored the fastest England Test century in terms of balls faced, at home or away, in the calendar year. The 1970 award was made to Geoffrey Boycott for "the most meritorious innings of the England v The Rest of the World series", but in 1971 the original version of the award was restored. Since 1985, the trophy has been decided in terms of balls faced rather than minutes spent at the crease.

University games were eligible for the trophy until 1995 and from 2001 to 2003. Until 2007, only first-class centuries could qualify for the award, but eligibility was widened in 2008 to include limited overs cricket. Graham Napier became the first man to win the trophy under these new conditions by scoring a 44-ball hundred in a Twenty20 match. Matches involving individual university sides (i.e. University Centre of Cricketing Excellence matches and the Varsity Match) are excluded, although games involving the combined British Universities team are eligible. Three other variants of the Walter Lawrence Trophy are also awarded annually:  Walter Lawrence Women's Award, Walter Lawrence MCC Universities Award and Walter Lawrence Schools Award.

Four batsmen have won the main award on more than one occasion, twice each: Ian Botham, Graham Lloyd, Leslie Ames and Viv Richards. Kent have the most winners (8) followed by Somerset (6). The winner of the main award for the 2021 English cricket season is England batter Liam Livingstone, who struck 100 in 42 balls against Pakistan in the first T20 international match.

Winners

References

External links

Cricket awards and rankings
Awards established in 1934
1934 establishments in England